Saguia el-Hamra was, with Río de Oro, one of the two territories that formed the Spanish province of Spanish Sahara after 1969. Its name comes from a waterway that goes through the capital. The wadi is inhabited by the Oulad Tidrarin Sahrawi tribe.

Occupying the northern part of Western Sahara, it lay between the 26th parallel north and 27°50'N. The city of Cape Bojador served to divide the regions. Its colonial capital was El Aaiún (Laâyoune), and it also included the city of Smara.

The territory takes its name from an intermittent river, the Saguia el-Hamra, the route of which runs west from south of El Farsia to reach the Atlantic at Laayoune.

References 

Former Spanish colonies
Geography of Western Sahara
States and territories established in 1969
States and territories disestablished in 1975
Arabic words and phrases
Spanish Sahara